Headless Rider (首なしライダー Kubinashi Rider) is a Japanese urban legend of a motorbike rider with a missing head.

Legend 
A piano wire was stretched across one road, where a rider was hit in the neck when he crashed into it on his bike at high speed. However, the motorbike continued to run for some time with the headless rider on board. He became a ghost and continues to wander that road at high speed at night (or at the time of death, anniversary of death, etc.). The decapitation is sometimes attributed to falling objects from road signs, guardrails or trucks. The reason for running around is often stated to be that he is looking for his murderer or his severed head.

There is also an urban legend of a 'headless biker gang', in which a group of headless riders explode on the mountain roads of Mount Hiko in Fukuoka Prefecture. There is also a variation in which decapitated heads are said to fly in, mostly with cries of despair, in a different location to where the motorbikes appear. It is not clear whether or not they are accompanied by helmets in this case.

Origin 
Rumours of headless riders only really took off after the release of the film Stone (1974 film) in Australia (released in Japan in 1981). The film contains a scene in which a rider's head is chopped off with piano wire set into the road, and this is said to have spread in connection with rumours of motorbike accidents in various parts of the country.

The urban legend is said to have originated from an actual accident in which a neighbour annoyed by a biker gang used a rope passed along the road to obstruct them, causing the bike to fall over. There are various theories about the original accident, but some say that it was actually just an accidental fatal motorbike accident there that was passed on in an amusing manner.

Some believe that it originated when a rider wearing a black full-face helmet on a dark road was mistakenly identified as a headless rider. In fact, some riders wearing black full-face helmets have told stories of being mistakenly identified as headless riders. There are also reportedly some fun-loving riders who deliberately wear black full-face helmets (which have been treated to reduce light reflections) at night in order to achieve this. Others say that witnesses may have mistaken a rider for a headless rider who was riding at night on a racer replica or supersport motorcycle in a prone position on top of the fuel tank.

See also 
Dullahan
The Legend of Sleepy Hollow
Cephalophore

References 

Japanese urban legends